The Joachim Dolomite is a Middle Ordovician geologic formation in Arkansas, Illinois, and Missouri.  The name was first introduced in 1894 by Arthur Winslow in his study of the geology of Missouri.  Winslow designated a stratotype along Plattin Creek, which was misidentified as Joachim Creek, in Jefferson County.  The name was introduced into Arkansas in 1911, replacing part of the, now abandoned, Izard Limestone.

See also

 List of fossiliferous stratigraphic units in Arkansas
 Paleontology in Arkansas

References

Ordovician Arkansas